Chitti Mitti (White Clay) is a small village in the Bandala Valley in the region of Azad Kashmir, Pakistan.

The village is west of the last two villages before the India - Pakistan Line of Control.

Populated places in Bhimber District